The Ambassador City Jomtien is a large hotel and convention centre at Jomtien Bay, near Pattaya, Thailand, with "over 4,000 rooms" . Located about 8 km south of Pattaya, it occupies a  campus overlooking the beach and nearby mountains. It consists of 5 buildings that each contain 150 to 2,000 suites. There are eight restaurants, several bars and nightclubs, a convention center, sport centre and what is claimed to be Asia's largest swimming pool.

The Ambassador City hosted the United Kingdom Contingent to the 20th World Scout Jamboree consisting of 2,500 young people aged between 14 and 18 and many of their support staff prior to the Jamboree at Sattahip in 2002/3.

The hotel is located at:
21/10 Sukhumvit Rd., Na Jomtien, Sattahip, Chonburi, 20250, Thailand

External links 
 www.ambassadorcityjomtien.com
 www.ambassador.city

Hotels in Thailand